William John Ward (October 25, 1880 – August 18, 1971) was a Canadian politician, farmer, insurance agent, and real estate agent from Dauphin, Manitoba. A member of the Ginger Group, he joined the Progressives in 1921, was a Liberal Progressive from 1926 to 1935, a Liberal from 1935 to 1957, and an Independent Liberal from 1957 to his death. He represented the Dauphin electoral district in the House of Commons of Canada from 1921 to 1930, 1935–1945, and 1949–1953.

Sources 
 

1880 births
1971 deaths
Canadian farmers
Members of the House of Commons of Canada from Manitoba
Progressive Party of Canada MPs
Ginger Group MPs
People from Dauphin, Manitoba
Liberal-Progressive MPs
Liberal Party of Canada MPs